Reefer Madness (originally made as Tell Your Children and sometimes titled The Burning Question, Dope Addict, Doped Youth, and Love Madness) is a 1936 American propaganda film about drugs, revolving around the melodramatic events that ensue when high school students are lured by pushers to try marijuana -- upon trying it, they become addicted, eventually leading them to become involved in various crimes such as a hit and run accident, manslaughter, murder, conspiracy to murder and attempted rape. While all this is happening, they suffer hallucinations, descend into insanity, associate with organized crime and (in one character's case) commit suicide. The film was directed by Louis J. Gasnier and featured a cast of mainly little-known actors.

Originally financed by a church group under the title Tell Your Children, the film was intended to be shown to parents as a morality tale attempting to teach them about the dangers of cannabis use. Soon after the film was shot, it was purchased by producer Dwain Esper, who re-cut the film for distribution on the exploitation film circuit, exploiting vulgar interest while escaping censorship under the guise of moral guidance, beginning in 1938–1939 through the 1940s and 1950s.

The film was "rediscovered" in the early 1970s and gained new life as an unintentional satire among advocates of cannabis policy reform. Critics have called it one of the worst films ever made and has gained a cult following within cannabis culture. Today, it is in the public domain in the United States.

Plot
Mae Coleman and Jack Perry are a cohabitating couple who sell marijuana. The unscrupulous Jack sells the drug to teenagers over Mae's objections; she'd rather stick to an adult clientele. Ralph Wiley, a sociopathic college dropout turned dealer, and siren Blanche help Jack recruit new customers. Ralph and Jack lure high school student Bill Harper and college student Jimmy Lane to Mae and Jack's apartment. Jimmy takes Bill to a party where Jack runs out of reefer, and Jimmy, who has a car, drives him to pick up more. When they get to Jack's boss' "headquarters", Jimmy asks for a cigarette as Jack gets out and he gives him a joint. By the time Jack returns, Jimmy is unknowingly high; he drives away recklessly and hits a pedestrian. A few days later, Jack tells Jimmy that the man died of his injuries and agrees to keep Jimmy's name out of the case -- if Jimmy will agree to "forget he was ever in Mae's apartment." As the police did not have enough specific details to track Jimmy down, he indeed escapes punishment.

Bill, whose once-pristine record at school has rapidly declined, has a fling with Blanche while high. Mary, Jimmy's sister and Bill's girlfriend, goes to Mae's apartment looking for Jimmy and accepts a joint from Ralph, thinking it's a regular cigarette. When she refuses Ralph's advances, he tries to rape her. Bill comes out of the bedroom and, still high, hallucinates that Mary is willingly offering herself to Ralph and attacks the latter. As the two are fighting, Jack knocks Bill unconscious with the butt of his gun, which inadvertently fires, killing Mary. Jack puts the gun in Bill's hand, framing him for Mary's death by claiming he blacked out. The dealers lie low for a while in Blanche's apartment while Bill's trial takes place. Over the objections of a skeptical juror, Bill is found guilty.

By now Ralph is paranoid from both marijuana and his guilty conscience. Blanche is also high; at one memorable point she plays the piano more and more rapidly as Ralph eggs her on. The boss tells Jack to shoot Ralph to prevent him from confessing, but when Jack arrives, Ralph immediately recognizes the threat and beats him to death with a stick as Blanche laughs uncontrollably in terror. The police arrest Ralph, Mae, and Blanche. Mae's confession leads to the boss and other gang members also being arrested. Blanche explains that Bill was innocent and agrees to serve as a material witness for the case against Ralph, but instead, she jumps out of a window and falls to her death, traumatized by her own adultery and its role in Mary's death. Bill's conviction is overturned, and Ralph, now nearly catatonic, is sent to an asylum for the criminally insane for the rest of his natural life.

The film's story is told in bracketing sequences, at a lecture given at a PTA meeting by high school principal Dr. Alfred Carroll. At the film's end, he tells the parents he has been told that events similar to those he has described are likely to happen again, then points to random parents in the audience and warns that "the next tragedy may be that of your daughter... or your son... or yours or yours..." before pointing straight at the camera and saying emphatically, "... or yours!" as the words "TELL YOUR CHILDREN" appear on the screen.

Cast

 Dorothy Short as Mary Lane
 Kenneth Craig as Bill Harper
 Lillian Miles as Blanche
 Dave O'Brien as Ralph Wiley
 Thelma White as Mae Coleman
 Carleton Young as Jack Perry
 Warren McCollum as Jimmy Lane
 Pat Royale as Agnes
 Josef Forte as Dr. Alfred Carroll
 Harry Harvey Jr. as Junior Harper
 Richard Alexander as Pete Daly, Pusher (uncredited)
 Lester Dorr as Joe – Bartender (uncredited)
 Edward LeSaint as The Judge (uncredited)
 Forrest Taylor as Blanche's Lawyer (uncredited)

Production and history

In 1936 or 1938, Tell Your Children was financed and made by a church group and intended to be shown to parents as a morality tale attempting to teach them about the dangers of cannabis use. It was originally produced by George Hirliman; however, some time after the film was made, it was purchased by exploitation filmmaker Dwain Esper, who inserted salacious shots. In 1938 or 1939, Esper began distributing it on the exploitation circuit where it was originally released in at least four territories, each with their own title for the film: the first territory to screen it was the South, where it went by Tell Your Children (1938 or 1939). West of Denver, Colorado, the film was generally known as Doped Youth (1940). In New England, it was known as Reefer Madness (1940 or 1947), while in the Pennsylvania/West Virginia territory it was called The Burning Question (1940). The film was then screened all over the country during the 1940s under these various titles and Albert Dezel of Detroit eventually bought all rights in 1951 for use in roadshow screenings throughout the 1950s.

Such education-exploitation films were common in the years following adoption of the stricter version of the Production Code in 1934. Other films included Esper's own earlier Marihuana (1936) and Elmer Clifton's Assassin of Youth (1937) and the subject of cannabis was particularly popular in the hysteria surrounding Anslinger's 1937 Marihuana Tax Act, a year after Reefer Madness.

Preservation and copyright status

The concept of after-market films in film distribution had not yet been developed, especially for films that existed outside the confines of the studio system, and were therefore considered "forbidden fruit." For this reason, neither Esper nor original producer George Hirliman bothered to protect the film's copyright; it thus had an improper copyright notice invalidating the copyright. Over 30 years later, in the spring of 1972, the founder of NORML, Keith Stroup, found a copy of the film in the Library of Congress archives and bought a print for $297. As part of a fundraising campaign, NORML showed Reefer Madness on college campuses up and down California, asking a $1 donation for admission and raising $16,000 toward support for the California Marijuana Initiative, a political group that sought to legalize marijuana in the 1972 fall elections. Robert Shaye of New Line Cinema eventually heard about the underground hit and went to see it at the Bleecker Street Cinema. He noticed the film carried an improper copyright notice and realized it was in the public domain. Seeking material for New Line's college circuit, he was able to obtain an original copy from a collector and began distributing the film nationally, "making a small fortune for New Line."

In 2004, Legend Films restored and colorized a print of the film, featuring intentionally unrealistic color schemes that add to the film's campy humor. The smoke from the "marihuana" was made to appear green, blue, orange and purple, each person's colored smoke representing their mood and the different "levels of 'addiction'". Film Freak Central criticized the colorization, writing that the color choices would better suit a film about LSD than a film about cannabis.

In 2020, a second restoration was produced by the Library of Congress in 4K from the original 35mm film elements.

Reception and legacy
Reefer Madness is considered to be a cult classic and one of the most popular examples of a midnight movie. Its fans enjoy the film for the same unintentionally campy production values that made it a hit in the 1970s.

The review aggregation website Rotten Tomatoes reported a 39% approval rating with an average rating of 4.4/10 based on 26 reviews. Metacritic, on the other hand, assigned a score of 70 out of 100, based on 4 critics, which suggests "generally favorable reviews".

The Los Angeles Times has claimed that Reefer Madness was the first film that a generation embraced as "the worst." Leonard Maltin has called it "the granddaddy of all 'Worst' movies." Las Vegas CityLife named it the "worst ever" runner-up to Plan 9 from Outer Space, and AMC described it as "one of the worst movies ever made."

Adaptations

The song "Reefer Madness" by space rock band Hawkwind is featured on their 1976 album Astounding Sounds, Amazing Music.

A 1992 stage adaptation by Sean Abley first opened in Chicago.

Clips from the film appear in the video for "Smoke the Sky", a song by American rock band Mötley Crüe from their self-titled 1994 album, with lyrics concerning marijuana use.

The film was satirized in an eponymous 1998 stage musical, later adapted as a 2005 television movie musical featuring Alan Cumming, Kristen Bell, Christian Campbell, and Ana Gasteyer.

The colorized DVD release featured a comedic audio commentary by writer, comedian and actor Michael J. Nelson of Mystery Science Theater 3000 and RiffTrax (later Mike would be joined by Kevin Murphy and Bill Corbett in live and studio versions).

The video game L.A. Noire includes a case, available as DLC, titled "Reefer Madness".

See also
 Hemp for Victory
 List of films considered the worst
 List of films in the public domain in the United States
 Perversion for Profit
 Sex Madness
 How to Undress in Front of Your Husband
 Reefer Madness (musical)

References

External links

 
 
 
 

1936 drama films
1930s independent films
1936 films
1936 in cannabis
American black-and-white films
American drama films
American exploitation films
American films about cannabis
American independent films
American propaganda films
American social guidance and drug education films
Anti-cannabis media
Articles containing video clips
Drugs in the United States
1930s English-language films
Films directed by Louis J. Gasnier
Films adapted into plays
1930s rediscovered films
Rediscovered American films
1930s American films